The Ursul is a river of Ongudaysky District, in the Altai Republic, Russia. The town Onguday lies on the Ursul.

Gallery

References

Rivers of the Altai Republic